Changy is the name or part of the name of the following communes in France:

 Changy, Loire, in the Loire department
 Changy, Marne, in the Marne department
 Changy, Saône-et-Loire, in the Saône-et-Loire department
 Chevannes-Changy, in the Nièvre department
 Varennes-Changy, in the Loiret department